III the EP is an extended play record released by Mondo Generator on November 22, 2004 by Tornado Records. This was the first release after Nick Oliveri was fired from Queens of the Stone Age. Mondo Generator embarked on a short European tour in support of this release in late 2004.

Track listing
 "All the Way Down" - (Nick Oliveri)
 "Bloody Hammer" - (Roky Erickson)
 "There She Goes Again" - (Nick Oliveri)
 "Sleep the Lie Away" - (Nick Oliveri/Dave Catching)

Personnel
 Nick Oliveri - Vocals, Bass (1, 3, 4)
 Dave Catching - Guitars
 Alfredo Hernández - Drums
 Molly McGuire - Bass (2), Piano (4)
 Mathias Schneeberger - Piano (1, 2), Guitar (1)

Produced by Nick Oliveri

Co-produced, Mixed, and Mastered by M. C. Schneebie at Donner & Blitzen

Trivia
 Track 1 entitled "All The Way Down" would be rerecorded for Mondo Generator's next album Dead Planet: SonicSlowMotionTrails.
 These tracks were rereleased on Oliveri's 2004 solo acoustic album entitled Demolition Day, and on the 2007 rerelease of Dead Planet.

References

Mondo Generator albums
2004 EPs